The Aluminum / aluminum 7049 alloy is a forging aluminum alloy. It has a high stress, corrosion, and cracking resistance  and high machinability. Alloy can be hot formed. It can not be weldable (in some cases, tungsten inert gas welding can applied).

Chemical Composition

Properties

Applications 

 structural forgings, especially in the missile or aircraft industries.
aircraft structural parts.
Forged aircraft and missile fittings 
landing gear cylinders 
extruded sections 
Structural forgings 
Missile industries

Designation 
Aluminium alloy EN AW 7049 has similarities to the following standard designations and specifications ;

 Alloy 7049
 UNS A97049
 ASTM B209
 DIN AlZn8MgCu

References

External links 
 7049 Aluminum :: MakeItFrom.com
 eFunda: Properties of Aluminum Alloy AA 7049
 Aluminum 7049 | Alloys International, Inc.
 MatWeb - The Online Materials Information Resource
 
 
 AA Standards Grade 7049 T73 - 7000 Series - Matmatch

Aluminium–zinc alloys